Francis Casey "Niño" Alcantara (born February 4, 1992) is a professional tennis player from the Philippines.

Career
Francis Alcantara first took the sport of the tennis when he was 6 years old and he was influenced by his father who played the sport as well. In front of their residence in Cagayan de Oro was a tennis court.

When Alcantara was 11 years old he was scouted by Romeo Chan as a tennis player. Chan who went to Cagayan de Oro invited Alcantara to reside and train with him in Manila. Alcantara accepted the offer and started playing in junior grand slams in various parts of the world.

He won the 2009 Australian Open Boys' Doubles event with Hsieh Cheng-peng, beating Mikhail Biryukov and Yasutaka Uchiyama, 6–4, 6–2 in the final.

On January 1, 2009, Alcantara reached his highest junior ranking of world number 14. In winning the 2009 Australian Open Boys' Doubles title, Alcantara and Cheng-peng did not lose a set during the entire tournament.

Alcantara completed his secondary education at Xavier University – Ateneo de Cagayan High School in March 2009.

Junior Grand Slam finals

Doubles: 1 (1 win)

Davis Cup 

   indicates the outcome of the Davis Cup match followed by the score, date, place of event, the zonal classification and its phase, and the court surface.

Challenger and Futures Finals

Singles: 1 (0–1)

Doubles: 36 (16–20)

ITF World Tennis Tour Juniors

Singles: 8 (5 titles, 3 runners-up)

Doubles: 18 (14 title, 4 runners-up)

References

External links
 
 
 

Australian Open (tennis) junior champions
Filipino male tennis players
Sportspeople from Cagayan de Oro
1992 births
Living people
Southeast Asian Games bronze medalists for the Philippines
Southeast Asian Games medalists in tennis
Tennis players at the 2018 Asian Games
Competitors at the 2017 Southeast Asian Games
Asian Games competitors for the Philippines
Grand Slam (tennis) champions in boys' doubles
Competitors at the 2019 Southeast Asian Games
Southeast Asian Games gold medalists for the Philippines
Southeast Asian Games competitors for the Philippines
Competitors at the 2021 Southeast Asian Games
Southeast Asian Games silver medalists for the Philippines